Shalva Apkhazava (born 14 August 1980 – 7 January 2004) was a Georgian professional football striker who played for FC Arsenal Kyiv in Ukraine. He died in 2004, just 23 years old, from heart disease.

References

1980 births
2004 deaths
People from Kobuleti
Footballers from Georgia (country)
Georgia (country) international footballers
Expatriate footballers from Georgia (country)
Expatriate footballers in Ukraine
Expatriate sportspeople from Georgia (country) in Ukraine
Association football forwards
FC Arsenal Kyiv players
FC Dinamo Batumi players
Ukrainian Premier League players